Jane Ross may refer to:

Jane Ross (collector) (1810–1879), Irish folksong collector 
Jane Ross (philanthropist) (1920–1999), American businesswoman and philanthropist
Jane Ross (footballer) (born 1989), Scottish footballer